The 9 teams were divided into 3 groups of 3 teams each. The teams played against each other on a home-and-away basis. The group winners would qualify.
Draw:draw in 12 December 1956  in Zurich 
Pot1:

CONMEBOL Group 1

 

Brazil qualified.

CONMEBOL Group 2

 

 

 

 

 

Argentina qualified.

CONMEBOL Group 3

 

 

 

 

 

Paraguay qualified.

Qualified Teams

1 Bold indicates champions for that year. Italic indicates hosts for that year.

Goalscorers

3 goals

 Omar Oreste Corbatta
 Norberto Menéndez
 Máximo Alcócer
 Juan Bautista Agüero
 Florencio Amarilla

2 goals

 Roberto Zárate
 Jaime Ramírez
 Ángel Jara Saguier
 Enrique Jara Saguier

1 goal

 Norberto Conde
 Eliseo Prado
 Ricardo Alcón
 Ausberto García
 Didi
 Índio
 Guillermo Díaz
 Carlos Arango
 Ricardo Díaz
 Jaime Gutiérrez
 Óscar Aguilera
 Alberto Terry
 Javier Ambrois
 Eladio Benítez
 William Martínez
 Óscar Míguez

Notes and references

External links 
 RSSF.com

 
FIFA World Cup qualification (CONMEBOL)